True Religion may refer to 
 One true faith or religious exclusivism
 True Religion, American clothing brand
 "True Religion", a song by Hot Tuna from the album Burgers

See also
 Of True Religion, a 1673 polemical tract by John Milton